Air Bud: Golden Receiver (also known as Air Bud 2) is a 1998 sports comedy film directed by Richard Martin. It is the sequel to Air Bud. The film was shot in Vancouver, British Columbia, Canada. It is also the last of the Air Bud films to be released theatrically. Outside the United States the film was often titled Air Bud 2. This film is dedicated in memory of the original Air Bud (Air Buddy), who died of Synovial sarcoma – a rare form of cancer that affects soft tissue near the joints of the arm, leg, or neck – in 1998, several months before the movie's release.

Unlike its predecessor, Air Bud: Golden Receiver was a box office failure, receiving negative reviews and grossing $10,224,116 against a budget of $11 million. The film received a 21% rating on Rotten Tomatoes, based on 29 reviews and an average rating of 4.3/10.

Plot 
Josh Framm (Kevin Zegers), now a teenager and a basketball player, becomes angry with his mother, Jackie, when she begins dating Patrick Sullivan, the town's new veterinarian, after a couple of failed dates with other people. Patrick innocently tosses Josh's basketball-savvy dog, Buddy, a football one day, and Josh discovers that Buddy also has an uncanny ability to play the sport of football. Soon enough, Buddy begins playing on Josh's Junior High football team after Tommy convinces Josh to sign up for football instead of basketball. At first, the team is failing miserably, and the school intends to fire the coach if he does not start winning. However, thanks to Buddy's superior football skills and fast running, the team keeps on winning and makes the playoffs. In addition, they advance to the championship.

Meanwhile, two Russians by the names of Natalya and Popov kidnap Buddy in hopes of having him perform as the special attraction in the Russian circus while Josh runs away when Patrick proposes to his mother. His coach finds him and convinces him that just because Patrick is in his life now, he does not have to stop loving his father and he returns home, but Patrick is gone and Buddy is missing.

The Timberwolves are forced to play the championship game without Buddy and are losing terribly. Buddy, in Natalya's and Popov's hands, knocks his cage over to unlock the hatch on a chimpanzee's cage hence letting the chimpanzee out, who then in return lets Buddy out. Buddy and the chimpanzee release all the other animals and they manage to escape. After the chimpanzee ambushes Natalya and Popov with fish guts and sword fighting, Natalya and Popov are arrested and placed into the custody of the Russian embassy as they collide their van, where they fly out of it and fall into a fishing vessel following a chase sequence involving Buddy as the victim.

Meanwhile, Patrick finds Buddy and takes him to the game.  With the help of Buddy, the team catches up, but Buddy is taken out of the game due to a subsequent injury. The Timberwolves are forced to finish the game without him and thanks to Josh and Tommy, they win the championship.

Later, Josh stops Patrick from leaving on a boat and convinces him to stay with the family.  The family later goes to a Seattle Seahawks football game and Buddy sneaks onto the field.

Cast

Rating 
Prior to the film's theatrical release, it was originally rated PG by the MPAA (as seen in the original theatrical trailer). However, by the time the film was released in theaters, it was given a G rating by the Motion Picture Association of America, making it the first Air Bud film to have been designated that rating in the United States.

Home media 
This film was released on VHS on December 15, 1998, and later released on DVD in 2000. Walt Disney Studios Home Entertainment continued its line of Air Bud Special Edition DVDs with the release of Air Bud: Golden Receiver Special Edition on February 2, 2010. The special edition includes a play-by-play action exclusive Sports Channel by the Buddies (the pups of Air Bud), led by Budderball.

Mill Creek Entertainment reissued the movie on January 14, 2020 on a 2-disc boxset also containing the other Air Bud movies owned by Air Bud Entertainment.

Critical reception 
On Rotten Tomatoes, it holds an approval rating of 21% based on 29 reviews, with an average rating of 4.3/10.

References

External links 
 
 
 
 
 

1998 films
1990s sports films
American sequel films
English-language Canadian films
Canadian sequel films
Films about dogs
American football films
Dimension Films films
Films about animals playing sports
Air Bud (series)
Films shot in Vancouver
Films about animals
DHX Media films
Canadian sports comedy films
1990s English-language films
1990s American films
1990s Canadian films